Piratula hurkai is a wolf spider species found in Ukraine, Russia, Georgia and Abkhazia.

See also 
 List of Lycosidae species

References 

Lycosidae
Spiders of Europe
Spiders of Russia
Spiders of Georgia (country)
Spiders described in 1966